Michael C. Wehr is a retired United States Army major general who last served as the 18th Director of Strategy, Capabilities, Policy, Programs, and Logistics of the United States Transportation Command. Previously, he served as the Deputy Chief of Engineers and Deputy Commanding General of the United States Army Corps of Engineers. Wehr earned a Bachelor of Science degree in civil engineering from Santa Clara University in 1985 and later received a Master of Science degree in civil engineering from the University of Texas at Austin.

References

American civil engineers
Cockrell School of Engineering alumni
Living people
Place of birth missing (living people)
Recipients of the Defense Superior Service Medal
Recipients of the Distinguished Service Medal (US Army)
Recipients of the Legion of Merit
Santa Clara University alumni
United States Army generals
United States Army personnel of the Gulf War
United States Army personnel of the War in Afghanistan (2001–2021)
Year of birth missing (living people)